HMS Dauntless is the second ship of the Type 45 or Daring-class air-defence destroyers built for the British Royal Navy. She was launched at Govan in January 2007, was handed over to the Royal Navy on 3 December 2009 and was formally commissioned on 3 June 2010.

Construction
Dauntlesss construction began at the BAE Systems Naval Ships yard at Govan in August 2004 on the River Clyde. She was launched on 23 January 2007 at 3.25 pm by Lady Burnell-Nugent, wife of Admiral Sir James Burnell-Nugent, the then-Commander-in-Chief Fleet. Dauntless is the adopted warship of Newcastle-upon-Tyne. Because her modules were put together outside at BAE Govan, it was possible to complete more of her structure than her sister ship, Daring, which was launched from the covered facility at Scotstoun the previous year.

Sea trials
Upon completing her fitting out stage, HMS Dauntless sailed from the Clyde for the first time on 14 November 2008 to conduct sea trials, testing power and propulsion, weapons and communications systems. Although not yet transferred to the Royal Navy, some of her future crew sailed with her. Dauntless arrived at HMNB Portsmouth for the first time on 2 December 2009, and was formally handed over to the Ministry of Defence by her builders on 3 December 2009. During her sea trials Dauntless made her inaugural visit to her affiliated city of Newcastle upon Tyne in May 2010.

Operational history
Dauntless was commissioned on 3 June 2010 in the presence of her sponsor. The MoD confirmed on 1 October 2010 that she had completed the first Sea Viper firing on a Hebridean firing range earlier in the week, and the ship was accepted into service on 16 November the same year.

In May 2011, Dauntless took part in Exercise Saxon Warrior in the Western Approaches, culminating in a so-called 'Thursday War'.

In June 2011, Dauntless sailed across the Atlantic Ocean to Norfolk, Virginia, to take part in the FRUKUS war game exercises between Russia, France, the United States and the United Kingdom. The deployment was the first time that two Lynxs had been deployed aboard a Type 45 destroyer.

In September 2011, Dauntless was the first of the Type 45 destroyers to visit London. She sailed up the Thames and berthed opposite London City Airport for the Defence and Security Equipment International event.
On 25 November 2011, HMS Dauntless hosted Abdullah Gül, President of the Republic of Turkey.

In January 2012, it was announced that Dauntless would deploy to the South Atlantic to replace  which was stationed around the Falkland Islands. The deployment was condemned by the government of Argentina, which claimed that the deployment represented a "militarization of the South Atlantic", despite the replacement representing only a modest increase in fighting capacity.

Between 2011 and 2012 she was commanded by Captain William Warrender.

In 2015, Dauntless re-sailed for the Middle East after a short delay, with a plan to take part in the centenary of the Gallipoli Campaign. She conducted anti-piracy patrols, as well as provide escort to U.S. Navy aircraft carrier  which is involved in airstrikes against ISIL. In November 2015, she participated with other NATO air defence ships in an "At Sea Demonstration", focusing on anti-ballistic missile warfare.

In April 2016, The Independent stated that the vessel had been relegated to use as a training ship due to manpower and technical shortages, although this was disputed by the MOD at the time. Her status as an engineering training ship pending entering refit was confirmed in June 2016.

In 2019 Dauntless underwent a regeneration refit in Portsmouth before sailing to Birkenhead in May 2020  as the first Type 45 to have new generators fitted under the Power Improvement Project. She left the shipyard on 14 June 2022 upon completion of the refit, and put to sea for the first time in two years.

Characteristics

Affiliations
The City of Newcastle upon Tyne
The Town of Great Yarmouth and the County of Norfolk
Adnams Brewery
The Worshipful Company of Clothworkers
The Worshipful Company of World Traders
The Royal Naval Reserve headquarters at HMS Calliope
The King's Royal Hussars
No. 51 Squadron RAF
No. 17 Squadron RAF
Newcastle United Football Club
The Percy Hedley Foundation in Forest Hall
The children's ward of Newcastle General Hospital
The Caister Lifeboat
Royal Grammar School, Newcastle
The Royal Hospital School
Suffolk & Norfolk District, Sea Cadet Corps
TS Lord Nelson, Norwich Sea Cadets (257)
TS Orwell, Ipswich Sea Cadets
TS Landguard, Felixstowe Sea Cadets
TS St Edmund, Bury St Edmunds Sea Cadets
TS Brave, Beccles Sea Cadets
TS Norfolk, Great Yarmouth Sea Cadets
TS Europa, Lowestoft Sea Cadets
TS Vancouver, King's Lynn Sea Cadets
TS Dauntless, Gosforth Sea Cadets (396)
TS Dauntless, Maritime Cadets

Notes

References

External links 

 

 

Type 45 destroyers
Ships built on the River Clyde
2007 ships
Destroyers of the United Kingdom